Edward Evans Seabrook (June 6, 1899 – May 19, 1968) was an American screenwriter.

Selected filmography
 Tanks a Million (1941)
 Hay Foot (1942)
 As You Were (1951)

References

Bibliography
 Erickson, Hal. Military Comedy Films: A Critical Survey and Filmography of Hollywood Releases Since 1918. McFarland, 2012.

External links

1899 births
1968 deaths
Writers from Portland, Oregon
Screenwriters from Oregon
20th-century American screenwriters